Barton Emory (Bob) Rhoads (October 4, 1879 – February 12, 1967), nicknamed "Dusty", was a major league pitcher for the Chicago Orphans, Cleveland Naps, and St. Louis Cardinals in the early 20th century. His best year was in 1906, when he won 22 games and had a 1.80 ERA. He finished his career with a 97–82 record, a 2.61 ERA and 522 strikeouts in 1,691.2 innings pitched.

He is buried at Mountain View Memorial Park in Barstow, California.

See also
 List of Major League Baseball no-hitters

References

External links
 Baseball-Reference.com

Major League Baseball pitchers
Baseball players from Ohio
Cleveland Naps players
Chicago Orphans players
St. Louis Cardinals players
People from Wooster, Ohio
1879 births
1967 deaths
Memphis Egyptians players